Ghisbertus Masius (c. 1545 – 1614) was the fourth bishop of 's-Hertogenbosch, in the Habsburg Netherlands, and sat in the Estates General of 1600 as a representative of the First Estate.

Life
Masius was born in Den Bommel around 1545 and studied at the University of Leuven, graduating Licentiate of Sacred Theology. He was appointed to a canonry of St. John's Cathedral, 's-Hertogenbosch, in 1579. On 1 November 1593 he was appointed bishop, and was consecrated in Brussels on 7 March 1594, taking possession of his see on 25 March. During the Siege of 's-Hertogenbosch in 1601 he was active in his support of the city's defenders.

Masius commissioned a catechism, the Catechismus voor de Catholijke jonckheijt des bisdoms van 's Hertoghenbosche, based on the Mechelen Catechism drafted by Lodewijk Makeblijde. In February 1612 he ordered that this be the basis of all religious instruction in the parishes and schools of his diocese.
On 9 and 10 October 1612, Masius presided at the second diocesan synod of 's-Hertogenbosch, the statutes of which were printed at Cologne in 1613.

Masius died on 2 July 1614 and was buried in his cathedral. He had been a friend and correspondent of Francis de Sales.

References

1614 deaths
Belgian bishops
17th-century Roman Catholic bishops in the Holy Roman Empire
Old University of Leuven alumni
Year of birth uncertain